Richard Witton (aka Richard Wytton) was a Master of University College, Oxford, England.

Witton was Fellow at University College and also a tenant of a College property. He became Master in 1423 or 1424, a post he held until 1428. He claimed that King Alfred had endowed the College with 78 Fellows, which was a complete fabrication. The College was poorer at the end of his time as Master.

References 

Year of birth missing
Year of death missing
15th-century English people
15th-century scholars
Fellows of University College, Oxford
Masters of University College, Oxford